The wildlife of Angola is composed of its flora and fauna.

An atlas of the amphibians and reptiles of Angola was published in 2018, and reported 117 species of amphibians and 278 of reptiles.

A major book on the biodiversity of Angola was published in 2019, and reported more than 2,000 species of organisms (plants, invertebrates and vertebrate animals), and 1,313 fossil species.

Fauna

Mammals

Birds

The avifauna of Angola includes a total of 983 species, of which 14 are endemic, 1 has been introduced by humans, and 4 are rare or accidental. 20 species are globally threatened.

The western Angola Endemic Bird Area has 14 range-restricted species. Little is known about the conservation status of the region's birds due to the Angolan Civil War from 1975 until 2002. The greatest diversity of restricted-range species is found in Cuanza Sul Province, and given the uncertainty about their current status, many of these species are listed as threatened. Gabela bushshrikes (Laniarius amboimensis) are common and Monteiro's bushshrikes (Malaconotus monteiri) are fairly common in degraded secondary forest, old coffee plantations and primary forest at Kumbira. Pulitzer's longbills (Macrosphenus pulitzeri) are fairly common at higher elevations at Kumbira as well as in the dense understorey of secondary forest west of Seles. Angola cave chats ((Xenocopsychus ansorgei) are found on the rocky slopes above the forest at Kumbira.

Insects

Fish

Reptiles
There are currently 278 species are recorded for the country

Amphibians
There are currently 117 species are recorded for the country.

Flora

The southern and central coasts include the welwitschia, a primitive conifer.  The grassy savanna around Lobito includes baobab and euphorbia trees.

The Huambo, Benguela and Huíla provinces are home to montane forest with rare flora.

The grassy savanna in the north includes miombo woodland and some evergreen forest.

Notes

References

Biota of Angola
Angola